Spinipterus is a genus of catfishes of the family Auchenipteridae.

Species
There are currently two described species in this genus:
 Spinipterus acsi 
 Spinipterus moijiri

References

Catfish genera
Auchenipteridae
Taxa named by Alberto Akama
Taxa named by Carl J. Ferraris Jr.